Hebrus burmeisteri is a species of velvet water bug in the family Hebridae. It is found in Central America and North America.

References

Articles created by Qbugbot
Insects described in 1896
Hebroidea